Deputy Chief Secretary for Administration is a ministerial position in the Government of Hong Kong, deputising the Chief Secretary for Administration, the second-highest position in Hong Kong. The position was created in 2022 after John Lee took office as Chief Executive.

History 
Deputy Chief Secretary was created in 1985 during the British colonial rule, responsible for elections and political systems, along with co-ordination of affairs involving more than two departments. The position was renamed to Secretary for Constitutional Affairs in 1989.

In October 2020, Carrie Lam, then Chief Executive, proposed the reconstruction of governmental departments during her last policy address, which also mulled creating the position of Deputy Chief Secretary for Administration to handle issues related to large-scale infrastructures. The recommendation was adopted by her successor, John Lee, and was installed on 1 July 2022 after his cabinet took office.

Role 
The Deputy Chief Secretary for Administration is responsible for assisting the Chief Secretary for Administration in supervising the departments as well as coordinating the formulation and implementation of policies that cut across various departments. He also plans, co-ordinates or takes charge of specific policy areas or projects as directed by the Chief Executive and/or the Chief Secretary for Administration.

List

Deputy Chief Secretaries, 1985–1989

Deputy Chief Secretaries for Administration, 2022–

References 

Positions of the Hong Kong Government